Pizzazz was a magazine published by Marvel Comics from 1977 to 1979, for a total run of 16 issues. Aimed at youth culture, Pizzazz mostly contained articles about popular movies, rock stars, et cetera, as well as comic strips and puzzles.

Contents 
Recurring features included a comic about Amy Carter's life as the President's daughter, a serialized Star Wars comic, and a one-page comic by Harvey Kurtzman (typically a "Hey Look!" piece done for the Marvel predecessor Timely Comics in the 1940s) on the last page. Regular columns included the reader dream-analyzing "Dream Dimensions" and the advice column "Dear Wendy". Once the magazine was established, a regular feature was a full-page illustration of some crowded scene in which the names of readers who had written letters to the magazine were hidden.

The covers showed either photos of popular celebrities, or photo-realistic drawings of celebrities and/or Marvel superheroes. Shaun Cassidy was featured on six covers, The Hulk appeared on five covers, Spider-Man on four, and Peter Frampton on three.

Topics mentioned in the magazine included (but were not limited to):
 The original Star Wars movie
 Grease
 Meat Loaf
 The movie Sgt. Pepper's Lonely Hearts Club Band
 Battlestar Galactica
 Superman: The Movie

Serialized Star Wars stories 
The 1977 installments of the serialized Star Wars comic featured in Pizzazz are the first original Star Wars stories not directly adapted from the films to appear in print form, preceding both the original stories in Marvel's Star Wars comic series and the 1978 novel Splinter of the Mind's Eye.

The first story arc, titled "The Keeper's World", was by Roy Thomas, Howard Chaykin, and Tony DeZuniga. It was later reprinted by Dark Horse Comics. The second story arc, entitled "The Kingdom of Ice", was by Archie Goodwin, Walt Simonson, Klaus Janson, Dave Cockrum, and John Tartaglione.  The final two chapters were scheduled to be printed in issues 17 and 18, but the magazine was canceled after the 16th issue. These two chapters were printed, along with the rest of the story, by Marvel UK in their Star Wars Weekly comic, appearing in issue 60 in April 1979.

See also 

 FOOM
 Marvel Age

References

External links
 Pizzazz at Mike's Amazing World of Comics

Monthly magazines published in the United States
Comics based on Star Wars
Comics by Archie Goodwin (comics)
Comics by Howard Chaykin
Comics by Roy Thomas
Comics by Walt Simonson
Defunct magazines published in the United States
Fanzines
Magazines about comics
Magazines established in 1977
Magazines disestablished in 1979
Marvel Comics titles
Comics magazines published in the United States